Dalmatinka is the third album by Croatian singer Severina. It was released in 1993 by Croatia Records.

Track listing 
"Dalmatinka" (Dalmatian Girl)
"Ljubi me noćas" (Kiss Me Tonight)
"Ne bi' ti oprostila" (I Wouldn't Forgive You)
"Maria Christina"
"Ti si moj" (You're Mine)
"Paloma nera" (Black Dove)
"Adio ljube" (Goodbye Love)
"Ne spavaj mala moja" (Don't Sleep, My Baby)
"Mornarica mlada" (Young Navy)
"Čovjek kojeg volim" (The Man I Love)

References

External links

1993 albums
Severina (singer) albums